Villa Elisa may refer to:
 Villa Elisa, Entre Ríos, Argentina
 Villa Elisa, Buenos Aires, a district of the municipality of La Plata, Argentina
 Villa Elisa, Dominican Republic, a municipal district in the Monte Cristi province
 Villa Elisa, Paraguay, a city in the metropolitan area of Asunción